The following is a list of the governments of the Republic of Cameroon since its unification on May 20, 1972.

Ahmadou Ahidjo First president of Cameroon (1960-1982)

First Government of unified Cameroon: no prime minister (1972-1975) 

 No prime minister from 3 July 1972 to 29 June 1975 (2 years, 11 months and 26 days):
 First Government of Unified Cameroon: Government of July 3, 1972
 Reshuffle of 8 February 1973
 Reshuffle of 29 December 1973
 Rescheduling of 7 June 1974

Government of Paul Biya (1975–1982) 

 Government of Paul Biya from 30 June 1975 to 6 November 1982 (7 years, 4 months and 7 days):
 Government of Paul Biya (1) from 30 June 1975 to 6 December 1976
 Government of Paul Biya (2) from 7 December 1977 to 1 May 1978
 Government of Paul Biya (3) from 2 May 1978 to 6 July 1980
 Government of Paul Biya (4) from 7 July 1980 to 22 July 1980
 Government of Paul Biya (5) from 23 July 1980 to 10 November 1980
 Government of Paul Biya (6) from 11 November 1980 to 3 November 1981
 Government of Paul Biya (7) from 4 November 1981 to 16 January 1982
 Government of Paul Biya (8) from 7 January 1982 to 5 November 1982

Government of Belo Bouba Maigari (1982–1983) 

 Government of Bello Bouba Maigari from 6 November 1982 to 22 August 1983 (9 months and 16 days)
 Government of Bello Bouba Maigari (1) from 11 June 1982 to 12 April 1983
 Government of Bello Bouba Maigari (2) from 13 April 1983 to 17 June 1983
 Government of Bello Bouba Maigari (3) from 18 June 1983 to 22 August 1983

Government of Luc Ayang (1983–1984) 

 Government of Luc Ayang from 22 August 1983 to 25 January 1984 (5 months and 3 days)

No prime minister (1984–1991) 

 No PM from 25 January 1984 to 26 April 1991 (7 years, 3 months and 1 day)
 Government of 4 February 1984
 Government of 7 July 1984
 Government of 24 August 1985
 Government of 21 November 1986
 Government of 23 January 1987
 Government of 4 December 1987
 Government of 16 May 1988
 Government of 13 April 1989
 Government of 23 April 1989
 Government of 7 December 1990

Government of Sado Hayatou (1991-1992) 

 Government of Sadou Hayatou from 26 April 1991 to 9 April 1992 (11 months and 14 days)

Government of Simon Achidi Achu (1992-1996) 

 Government of Simon Achidi Achu from 9 April 1992 to 19 September 1996: (4 years, 5 months and 10 days)
 Government of Simon Achidi Achu (1) from 9 April 1992 to 29 August 1992
 Government of Simon Achidi Achu (2) from 30 August 1992 to 3 September 1992
 Government of Simon Achidi Achu (3) from 4 September 1992 to 24 November 1992
 Government of Simon Achidi Achu (4) from 25 November 1992 to 26 November 1992
 Government of Simon Achidi Achu (5) from 27 November 1992 to 20 July 1994
 Government of Simon Achidi Achu (6) from 21 July 1994 to 19 September 1996

Government of Peter Mafany Musonge (1996–2004) 

 Government of Peter Mafany Musonge from 19 September 1996 to 8 December 2004 (8 years, 2 months and 19 days):
 Government of Peter Mafany Musonge (1) from 19 September 1996 to 6 December 1997
 Government of Peter Mafany Musonge (2) from 7 December 1997 to 31 August 1999
 Government of Peter Mafany Musonge (3) from 1 September 1999 to 17 March 2000
 Government of Peter Mafany Musonge (4) from 18 March 2000 to 26 April 2001
 Government of Peter Mafany Musonge (5) from 27 April 2001 to 23 August 2002
 Government of Peter Mafany Musonge (6) from 24 August 2002 to 22 April 2004
 Government of Peter Mafany Musonge (7) from 23 April 2004 to 8 December 2004

Government of Ephraim Inoni (2004-2009) 

 Government Ephraim Inoni from December 8, 2004 to June 30, 2009 (4 years, 6 months and 22 days):
 Government of Ephraim Inoni (1) from 8 December 2004 to 21 September 2006
 Government of Ephraim Inoni (2) from 22 September 2006 to 6 June 2007
 Government of Ephraim Inoni (3) from 7 September 2007 to 30 June 2009

Government of Philemon Yang (2009-2019) 

 Government of Philemon Yang since 30 June 2009
 Government of Philemon Yang (1) from 30 June 2009 to 8 December 2011
 Government of Philemon Yang (2) from 9 December 2011 to 1 October 2015
 Government of Philemon Yang (3) from 2 October 2015 to 1 March 2018
 Government of Philemon Yang (4) from 2 March 2018

Government of Joseph Ngute (2019-) 

 Joseph Ngute's government

See also 
 Prime Ministers of Cameroon
 Presidents of Cameroon
History of Cameroon

References

External links 
 Government official website

Government of Cameroon
Political history of Cameroon